Fortune's Fool is a 1796 comedy play by the English writer Frederic Reynolds. It was first staged at the Covent Garden Theatre in London.

The original cast included William Thomas Lewis as Ap-Hazard, John Quick as Sir Bamber Blackletter, John Fawcett as Tom Seymour, William Macready  as  Orville and Isabella Mattocks as Miss Union.

References

Bibliography
 Hogan, C.B (ed.) The London Stage, 1660–1800: Volume V. Southern Illinois University Press, 1968.
 Nicoll, Allardyce. A History of English Drama 1660-1900. Volume III: Late Eighteenth Century Drama. Cambridge University Press, 1952.

Plays by Frederic Reynolds
1796 plays
West End plays
Comedy plays